Brzoskwinia  is a village in the administrative district of Gmina Zabierzów, within Kraków County, Lesser Poland Voivodeship, in southern Poland. It is located in the historic region of Lesser Poland.

The village has an approximate population of 900.

References

Brzoskwinia